The social security system in Poland includes the following components:
Social insurance and welfare system
Health insurance system (see :pl:Ubezpieczenie zdrowotne  and Health care in Poland)
Unemployment benefits
Family benefits

The main institutions responsible for social security are:
Social Insurance Institution (Zakład Ubezpieczeń Społecznych, ZUS)
 (Kasa Rolniczego Ubezpieczenia Społecznego, KRUS)
Ministry of Family, Labour and Social Policy (Ministerstwo Rodziny, Pracy i Polityki Społecznej, MRPiPS)
 National Health Fund (Narodowy Fundusz Zdrowia, NFZ) 
 (otwarte fundusze emerytalne, OFE)
 (pracownicze programy emerytalne, PPE)

References

Social security in Poland